Dryander is a family name. It originates as a 16th-century Humanist name, literally meaning (in Ancient Greek) "oak-man". It was used by people whose original name was Eichmann ("oak-man"), Eichholz ("oak-wood"), de Enzinas ("of the holm-oaks") etc., notable people with the surname include:

Athaulphus Dryander (1490–1563), adopted name of Adolf Eichholz, German humanist and jurist
Johann Dryander (Eichmann) (1500–1560), German physician and scholar
Franciscus Dryander (1518–1552), adopted name of Francisco de Enzinas, Spanish humanist
Jacobus Dryander (c. 1520 – 1547), adopted name of Diego de Enzinas, Spanish scholar
Jonas Carlsson Dryander (also "Johann Dryander"), Swedish botanist (1748–1810)
Johann Friedrich Dryander (1756–1812), German painter

Dryander is also
a literary character in the novel Dichter und ihre Gesellen from German author Joseph Freiherr von Eichendorff (1788–1857)